Varga may refer to:
 Varga, Hungary, a village in Hungary
 Varga (astrology), a technical division in Indian astrology 
 Varga (band), a Canadian metal band
 Varga (comics), a Filipino comic book character
 Komiks Presents: Varga, a Philippines TV series 
 Varga girls, World War-II era pin-ups by Alberto Vargas
 Varga Studio, a Hungarian animation studio
 Varga (surname)
 Varga, a character in Doctor Who episode "The Ice Warriors"
 Varga plants, a poisonous plant in Doctor Who episode "Mission to the Unknown"

See also 
 
Varg (disambiguation)
 Vargas (disambiguation)
 Wergea